Preston is a suburb about a mile north of North Shields, North Tyneside. Its population was recorded at 8419 in the 2011 census. Historically a separate entity, it has slowly been absorbed into the town to the south and expanded as to form a continuous urban area north to Monkseaton.

History of Preston and 'Preston Township' 
The area derives its name from the old English "Preosta", meaning Priest and "Tun", meaning enclosure or homestead. It is first mentioned in a charter dated between 1106 and 1116 and is recorded in the St. Alban's Register. At about this time the lands of Preston were granted by King Henry I to the monks of St. Oswin at Tynemouth. At the time of the Dissolution of the Monasteries in 1539, the lands were returned to the Crown. In 1832 Preston Township, together with Tynemouth, North Shields and Cullercoats was constituted a Parliamentary Borough and by an order granted on 6 August 1849, the four were incorporated into Tynemouth Borough for municipal purposes.

Preston Township lay between North Shields to the south and Monkseaton to the north. To the east was the village of Tynemouth and to the west, Chirton. This annex was originally known as Northumberland Place but is nowadays known as West Allotment.

Over its history, the main industries of Preston have been coal mining (from the 12th to the 20th centuries), the tanneries of the 13th century, the breweries of the  17th, 18th and 19th centuries, the damask factory of the 19th century and the carriage works of the late 19th and early 20th centuries.

It occupies a fine eminence which commands an extensive and beautiful prospect. Here are several gentlemen's villas, two public gardens, two common breweries, four public houses and a linen manufactory: besides about 100 houses and cottages which have a neat and clean appearance."

William Harold Smurthwaite published a detailed history of Preston in 1992 entitled Our Heritage – Preston Township and Preston Village. It was illustrated by Kevin Bradley, who had previously produced a book about the Township, entitled An Illustrated Guide To Preston Township. This book including original illustrations is currently being published digitally by Kevin Bradley and George Smith; it is available at https://www.prestontownship.org.uk.

Leisure 
Tynemouth Pool is situated within the village, as are Preston Playing Fields, and the sporting facilities of John Spence Community High School. Foxhunters Field, a large open area of parkland and playing fields is to be found to the north. The area is also home to many local sporting clubs: North Shields Rugby Football Club which has its clubhouse on Preston playing fields, Percy Park RFC on Preston Avenue, Tynemouth Cricket Club and nearby Tynemouth Golf Club. North Shields Football Club also used to be based at Appleby Park before moving to their current Silkeys Lane site.

Education 
The area has two primary schools: Preston Grange Primary School, on the Preston Grange estate, and King Edward Primary School on Preston Avenue. Secondary education is provided by John Spence Community High School, formerly Preston High School, and further education by Queen Alexandra Sixth Form College (part of Tyne Metropolitan College).

Services 
The area contains many of the services for North Shields: North Tyneside East Fire Station, Preston Cemetery, North Tyneside General Hospital (which replaced Preston Hospital in the late 1980s) and a large Morrisons supermarket.

Religion 
There are a number of churches and religious buildings in the area:

Baptists Together 
 Preston Grange Community Church

Church of England 
 St Hilda's, Preston Road

Catholic Church 
 St Mary's, Marden

The Church of Jesus Christ of Latter-day Saints 
 meetinghouse, Malvern Road

Public Houses 

The area has six Pubs; The Gunner, The Alexandra, The Sportsman, The Spread Eagle, The Foxhunters and The Magic Lantern.

References

Populated places in Tyne and Wear
North Shields